The Flag of Gascony represents the region of Gascony, located in France. The legend says that this flag appeared in the time of Pope Clement III (term 1187–1191) to gather the Gascons during the Third Crusade (12th century), but no proof of this allegation has yet been found. The Chronica of Rogeri de Houedene, often taken as a proof for the creation of this flag, only mentions the crosses taken by the crusaders of three nations: the French (a red cross), the English (a white cross) and the Flemish (a green cross).

That flag contains the St Andrew's cross, the patron saint of Bordeaux and the red color of the Kingdom of England, which reigned over Gascony from the 12th to the mid-15th century.

After the end of the Hundred Years' War (1337–1453), the flag went out of use and was never replaced.

A modern blazon (blue and red with sheaf of wheat and lion) was created in Versailles by the judge of weapons' cabinet (chief of protocol) of French king Louis XIV in 1697–1709, in order to add symbolically the province to the French royal coat of arms.

The contemporary return of the historic flag of Gascony is ought to convey identity and values which make of this province a land of "douceur de vivre" (sweetness of life): soft climate, authenticity of relationship, conviviality, good wines and art of dining.

The Saltire, lo Sautèr

The Gascony does not have any institutional unity since the 11th century, hence several flag versions are currently used on the territory.

The Saltire, sometimes called "Union Gascona" (Gascon Union) is a white Saint-Andrew's cross on a red background. Some say that it was originally given by Pope Clement III at the time of the Third Crusade but there has been no evidence of that assumption yet.

It is often said that the text of the chronicler Roger of Howden mentioned that Pope Clement III gave crosses to the kings of France and England (Richard I of England as well duke of Aquitania and Gascony) during the Gisors conference in 1188 and that these kings then assigned flags, with the cross on it, to their respective nations. The following text ("The French flags" on the website Heraldica, accessed 04-22-2010) is about this event:
The kings of France and England were in a peace conference in a field between Gisors and Trie, in January 1188, when the archbishop of Tyre arrived with the news of the conquest of Jerusalem by Saladdin, and an urgent plea for a new crusade. The event is told by the contemporary chronicler Roger de Hoveden (R. de Houedene, Chronica, ed. William Stubbs, vol. 2, London, 1869, p. 335). At this conference came the archbishop of Tyre, who [...] moved their hearts to taking the cross. And those who were enemies before, by his predication and God’s help, became friends that day, and received the cross from his hand ; and in that moment the sign of the cross appeared above them in the sky. On seeing that miracle, many rushed in droves to take the cross. And said kings, when taking the cross, chose a visible sign for themselves and their people to identify their nation. The king of France and his people took red crosses ; the king of England with his people took white crosses ; and Philip count of Flanders with his people took green crosses ; and thus everyone returned home to provide for the needs of his journey. [… ad cognoscendam gentem suam signum evidens sibi et suis providerunt, ... et sic unusquisque ...]

The original text of Howden stops here. What comes next is an addition from F. Velde: "It is often said that the system was extended to other regions or nations : Brittany’s cross was black, Lorraine green, Italy and Sweden yellow, Burgundy a red Saint Andrew’s, Gascony a white Saint Andrew’s."

Thus we cannot confirm that the gascon saltire comes from the Crusades or even the Middle Ages. At least was it known at the time when F. Velde wrote this article. As Saint Andrew is the patron of Bordeaux that could be a hint for its origin.

In the tome 14 of the Grande Encyclopédie, published in France between 1886 and 1902 by Henri Lamirault, one can read that 
(During the hard times of the Hundred Years' War and the terrible struggles between the Armagnacs, representing the national party (white cross) and the Burgundians, allied to the English (red cross and red Saint-Andrews' cross), the flag of the victorious English ends up gathering, in 1422, under Henri VI, on its field the white and red crosses of France and England, the white and red Saint-Andrew's crosses of Guyenne and Burgundy.)

On the website Gasconha.com a message from M. Fourment (12-15-2006) returns to the website svowebmaster.free.fr on which would be written that the Saltire was declared "official flag of Gascony" on 13 January in 1903, but without any other precision, nor source (perhaps was it in the context of the Félibrige that was then developing).

The red and white colors are statistically dominants in the heraldry of the gascon countries. This red and white flag, or Saltire, lo(u) Sautèr, is considered as being the flag of the Gascon people.

Therefore this gascon saltire could have picked up some ancient traditions. Even if it would only be dated from the end of the 19th century of the beginning of the 20th, it follows the rules of vexillology (simplicity, distant readability). It corresponds to the color and the pattern of the talenquères in many bullrings in Gascony.

The Quarterly, l'Esquarterat

However, another flag is used: the Quarterly. It corresponds to the arms of the ancient province of Gascony put in a banner.

This province was smaller than the current Gascony (also called "cultural and linguistic Gascony), it included neither the Béarn nor the gascon part of the Guyenne, but it included the basque provinces of the Labourd and the Soule.

Dame Flag, Drapeau à la Dame

Gascon cultural flag proposed to promote the whole of Gascon culture. Red and white are the cultural colors of Gascony. The triangular shape and a young symbol representing Gascony, often described as a triangle bordering the Garonne, the Pyrenees and the Atlantic Ocean. The head in the middle is none other than the statue of the Venus of Brassempouy. Found in the Landes de Gascogne, it dates back 25,000 years and is the oldest known human face today. It does not even measure 4 cm, carved in mammoth ivory with stone. This flag has not gained much popularity but is sometimes used.

References

12th-century establishments in France
Gascony
Third Crusade
Gascony
History of Nouvelle-Aquitaine
History of Occitania (administrative region)
Gascony